Paul Regan Swadel (23 October 1968 – 18 March 2016) was a New Zealand film director and producer.

Life and career
Swadel nurtured a filmmaking partnership with James Cunningham that spanned fifteen years and four globally successful short films. Their film Infection competed at Cannes International Film Festival 2000, Sundance Film Festival 2001 and twenty other international film festivals. Paul and James developed an indie performance capture driven CGI film Marshal with Mark Ordesky, executive producer of The Lord of the Rings. Their proof of concept short film Poppy, was shot on the Weta Digital motion capture soundstage. Poppy features Matthew Sunderland, winner of Best Actor Award at the 2008 NZ Screen Awards.

Swadel was a co-executive producer of Headstrong with Ant Timpson and Leanne Saunders. Their feature film The Devil Dared Me To had its world premiere at SXSW and screened at over twenty International Film Festivals. It has been sold to Wild Bunch for the United Kingdom, Vivendi for the United States and Boll AG for rest of the world. Their second feature film A Song of Good began its festival run with a World Premiere at Rotterdam Film Festival where it sold out all of its screenings. It garnered 5 nominations at the 2008 New Zealand Screen Awards, and won a Best Picture Award.

He also directed a significant number of award-winning art documentaries around the world. These range in subject from Plácido Domingo at the New York Metropolitan Opera, The Understudy, to an award-winning six-hour series on the history of New Zealand Art, The Big Picture presented by Hamish Keith, which garnered three nominations at the 2008 New Zealand Screen Awards, and won Best Series and Best Music awards.

Swadel died on 18 March 2016, after suffering from early-onset Alzheimer's disease. He was survived by his son Felix, as well as his parents, siblings and other family members.

Gallery

Filmography

References

External links
 
 Poppy: Short film official website
 Blue Harvest: Executive Producing Shorts w/- NZFC

1969 births
2016 deaths
New Zealand film directors
New Zealand film producers
University of Auckland alumni
University of Canterbury alumni